Richard Kristian Gutierrez (born January 21, 1984), known professionally as Richard Gutierrez, is a Filipino actor and model. He is one of the sons of actor Eddie Gutierrez.

He is a contract artist of ABS-CBN's Star Magic.

Early life
Richard Gutierrez was born on January 21, 1984, in Beverly Hills, California, United States with his twin brother, Raymond Gutierrez to actor Eddie Gutierrez and Annabelle Rama. He has five siblings (Ruffa Gutierrez, Rocky Gutierrez, Elvis Gutierrez, Raymond Gutiérrez and Ritchie Paul Gutierrez) and two half-brothers (Tonton Gutierrez and Ramon Christopher Gutierrez).

Career
Gutierrez began acting as a child with his twin brother. He has worked in many movies with his father and his brothers. He appeared on the GMA-7 show Click and primetime series Ikaw Lang ang Mamahalin and Habang Kapiling Ka with Angelika dela Cruz. He starred in the TV fantasy series Mulawin which aired from August 2, 2004 until March 18, 2005, where he played the lead character Aguiluz. The series led to a feature-length film of the same name (Mulawin: The Movie). Since then he has played lead roles in other GMA-7 shows including Sugo, Kamandag, Codename: Asero, Zorro, Lupin, Full House and Captain Barbell (both the 2006 prequel and the 2011 sequel). Gutierrez signed a non-exclusivity contract with Viva Artists Agency in 2008, wherein he worked in a movie Patient X and where his ex-girlfriend Anne Curtis is a talent; in 2015, he, his twin brother Raymond and sister Ruffa signed an exclusivity contract with Viva Artists Agency.

In 2012, Gutiérrez headlined GMA Network's upcoming Heavy Drama & Action Series entitled Makapiling Kang Muli. He is also an Greenpeace spokesperson and environmentalist and  hosted documentary and reality series and television specials such as Anatomy of a Disaster, Full Force Nature, Pinoy Adventures, Signos: Banta ng Nagbabagong Klima, Planet Philippines, the third and fourth seasons of Survivor Philippines, Oras Na, Wildlife for Sale, Extra Challenge Extreme and Puso ng Pasko: Artista Challenge.

Gutierrez was a freelance actor following the end of his exclusive contract with GMA Network on June 26, 2013. On August 7, it was reported by the Philippine Entertainment Portal that Guiterrez had fathered a child with Sarah Lahbati. The couple welcomed a boy whom they named Zion back in April 2013. He later confirmed the news on the first episode of It Takes Gutz to Be a Gutierrez, a reality TV program that revolves around his family's life. The show began airing on June 2014.

In 2017, Richard signed a contract with ABS-CBN, and starred in the horror fantasy series La Luna Sangre and he joined the cast of Ang Probinsyano in 2020. In 2022, he will lead his own series titled The Iron Heart.

Controversy
In 2009, Gutierrez was charged with reckless imprudence, arising from the death of his production assistant, Norman Pardo, who died in a car accident in May 2009. Gutierrez and Pardo were driving to Manila from Silang, Cavite. Gutierrez was injured, and Pardo, seated in the passenger seat, died on the spot.

In August 2012, the Court of Appeals reinstated the charge of reckless imprudence resulting in homicide. The appellate court granted the petition filed by Pardo's widow seeking the nullification of the two resolutions that had been issued by former justice secretaries Agnes Devanadera and Alberto Agra, respectively. The appellate court stated, "To the mind of this court, if indeed private respondent was not driving fast, it would have been easy for him to stop his car and thwart any untoward incident."

Personal life
In March 14, 2020, Gutierrez married StarStruck V's Ultimate Female Survivor, Sarah Lahbati in Taguig. They have two sons together, Zion (born April 29, 2013) and Kai (born March 21, 2018).

Filmography

Documentary

Films

TV dramas

Game shows

Magazine and talk shows

Reality shows

Variety shows

Awards and nominations
Golden Screen TV Awards
2011: Outstanding Adapted Reality Competition Program Host Nominee for Survivor Philippines: Celebrity Edition
2011: Outstanding Natural History/Wildlife Program Host Nominee for Anatomy of a Disaster
2013: Outstanding Adapted Reality/Competition Program Host Nominee for Survivor Philippines: Double Celebrity Showdown
2013: Outstanding Natural History/Wildlife Program Host Nominee for Oras Na
UPLB Gandingan Awards
2011: Gandingan ng Edukasyon Special Citation
PMPC Star Awards for Television
2012: Best Lifestyle/Travel Show Host Winner for Pinoy Adventures 
2013: Best Reality Competition Program Host Pending Nominee for Extra Challenge
FAMAS Awards
1988: Best Child Actor Nomination for Takbo, bilis... takboooo! 
2009 : Best Actor Nomination for For the First Time 
2015: Face of the Night with Toni Gonzaga
German Moreno Youth Achievement Award
2004:German Moreno Youth Achievement Award Awardee 
GMMSF Box-Office Entertainment Awards
2003 Guillermo Mendoza Memorial Scholarship Foundation: Most Promising Male Actor
2004 Guillermo Mendoza Memorial Scholarship Foundation: Prince of RP Movies 
2006 Guillermo Mendoza Memorial Scholarship Foundation: Prince of Philippine Movies & TV (for Let the Love Begin)
2008: Prince of Philippine Movies (for The Promise) and King of Valentine Movies
2009: Valentine Box-Office King Winner (with Marian Rivera) for My Best Friend's Girlfriend and Prince of Philippine Movies & TV  for For The First Time

Notes

References

External links

1984 births
Living people
ABS-CBN personalities
American emigrants to the Philippines
American models of Filipino descent
Beverly Hills High School alumni
Filipino environmentalists
Filipino male child actors
Filipino male film actors
Filipino male models
Filipino male television actors
Filipino people of American descent
Filipino people of Canadian descent
Filipino people of Spanish descent
GMA Network personalities
Richard
Star Magic
TV5 (Philippine TV network) personalities
Filipino twins
Viva Artists Agency
20th-century Filipino male actors
21st-century Filipino male actors